Ernane Ferreira Cavalheira Campos or simply Ernane  (born May 2, 1985, in Nilópolis), is a Brazilian attacking midfielder. He currently plays for Vasco.

Honours
Bahia state Cup: 2002
World Cup (U 20): 2005
Marseille Tournament: 2002
Chile Octagonal Tournament: 2005

Contract
2 January 2007 to 2 January 2011

External links
 globoesporte
 crvascodagama.com
 CBF
 sambafoot
 Guardian Stats Centre
 netvasco.com

1985 births
Living people
Brazilian footballers
Brazil under-20 international footballers
Esporte Clube Bahia players
CR Vasco da Gama players
Ipatinga Futebol Clube players
Association football midfielders